Eucalyptus neutra, commonly known as the Newdegate mallee, is a species of mallee that is endemic to the south-west of Western Australia. It has greyish bark, lance-shaped adult leaves, flower buds usually in groups of seven, pale yellow to white flowers and barrel-shaped to shortened spherical fruit.

Description
The bark is smooth cream-coloured to tan and peels in short strips to reveal salmon pink to copper-coloured new bark. Flowering occurs on November and February and the flowers are pale yellow to white.

Taxonomy and naming
The specific epithet (neutra) is a Latin word meaning "middle", referring to this species being in an intermediate position between E. flocktoniae and E. aff. transcontinentalis.

Distribution and habitat
Newdegate mallee is found on plains and hillsides, between ridges and on road verges from near Lake King towards Corrigin and Jerramungup the Avon Wheatbelt, Coolgardie, Esperance Plains and Mallee biogeographic regions of Western Australia where it grows in gravelly sandy-clay-loam soils.

Conservation status
This eucalypt is classified as "not threatened" by the Western Australian Government Department of Parks and Wildlife.

See also
List of Eucalyptus species

References

Eucalypts of Western Australia
neutra
Myrtales of Australia
Plants described in 1999
Mallees (habit)